Steven Tweed (born 8 August 1972) is a Scottish former footballer and manager.

Tweed started his career in Scotland with Hibernian, for whom he made over 100 league appearances. He made his first move abroad in 1996 when he joined Greek side Ionikos. Tweed then returned to the UK with Stoke City and then Dundee. He then played for German side MSV Duisburg and Japanese outfit Yokohama before returning to Scotland with Livingston, East Fife and ended his career with Montrose he was manager of Montrose for two years.

Career
Tweed was born in Edinburgh and began his career with Hibernian making his debut in the 1991–92 season. He became a regular under Alex Miller making 126 appearances for Hibs scoring five goals in five seasons at Easter Road. Tweed played twice for Scotland at B international level in 1995, featuring in wins against Northern Ireland and Sweden. He left Hibernian in 1996–97 to play for Greek Alpha Ethniki side Ionikos. However he did no have a good time in Nikaia playing under Oleg Blokhin, Sokratis Gemelos and Jacek Gmoch saw him make just two appearances for "Galanolefki". He returned to Britain in the summer of 1997 signing for English club Stoke City. Stoke had an awful 1997–98 campaign which saw them relegated to the third tier with Tweed playing in 44 matches that season. He failed to get in the side under Brian Little in 1998–99 and returned to Scotland in March 1998 joining Dundee. Tweed spent three seasons at Dens Park before moving abroad again in 2001, signing for German 2. Bundesliga club MSV Duisburg. After two seasons at Wedaustadion he then moved to J2 League club Yokohama FC in 2004. He spent three seasons at the Nippatsu Mitsuzawa Stadium before returning to Scotland with First Division club Livingston in 2006 where he spent the 2006–07 season. Tweed then moved to East Fife in 2007, initially on loan and then permanently.

In January 2009, he was appointed player-manager of Montrose. Montrose narrowly missed out on a play-off place in the last game of the 2008–09 season. During the 2009 close season, Tweed introduced 12 new players, with Jim Moffatt (assistant) and Tony Bullock (goalkeeping) helping with coaching. Montrose endured a winless streak in the league lasting until mid January. A bright spot of the 2009–10 season was a Scottish Cup run, which ended in a 5–1 defeat to Hibernian. Tweed won the SFL Manager of the Month award for March 2010. He resigned in March 2011 due to work and family commitments. On 17 June 2011, Steven Tweed joined Broughty Athletic a Scottish junior football club, he stayed until 17 December 2011 when he left the club.

Personal life
Tweed, a former Hibs player, is the nephew of Hearts legend Tommy Walker.

Club statistics
Source:

A.  The "Other" column constitutes appearances and goals in the Football League Trophy and Scottish Challenge Cup, .

References

External links
 

 Scotland U21 stats at Fitbastats

1972 births
Living people
Footballers from Edinburgh
Association football central defenders
Scottish footballers
Scotland B international footballers
Hibernian F.C. players
Ionikos F.C. players
Stoke City F.C. players
Dundee F.C. players
MSV Duisburg players
Yokohama FC players
Livingston F.C. players
East Fife F.C. players
Montrose F.C. players
Scottish Football League players
English Football League players
Scottish Premier League players
Super League Greece players
J2 League players
Scottish expatriate footballers
Expatriate footballers in Greece
Expatriate footballers in Germany
Expatriate footballers in Japan
Scottish football managers
Montrose F.C. managers
Scotland under-21 international footballers
Scottish Football League managers
2. Bundesliga players
Broughty Athletic F.C. players